Flávio Ortega (1944 – 6 February 2007) was a Brazilian football player and manager, who spent most of his career in Central America, mainly in Honduras.

Club career
Ortega was a Brazilian footballer who started playing in 1962 and moved abroad to play in El Salvador. He came to Honduras in 1968. He played for Real España and Marathón of San Pedro Sula, rising to become an important player for both clubs.

Ortega was the Honduran league's leading goal-scorer with 18 goals for Marathón in the 1969–70 season. He scored 45 goals in the Honduran league in 110 matches.

Managerial career
After he retired from playing, Ortega managed the Honduras national football team at the 1991 CONCACAF Gold Cup finals, leading Honduras to a second-place finish. He won the 1994 CONCACAF Champions' Cup with Costa Rican side Cartaginés.

Honduran clubs statistics

Personal life and death
Ortega's mother's name is Maria Candida Sanches, he had a brother named Esteban Ortega Filho and a sister named Rosa Maria Ortega Santos. He was married to Honduran Ligia Hernández de Ortega and the couple had four children: Claudia, Flavio, and twins Liliane and Lilian. He became a Honduran citizen in 1992. In 2005, when with Platense, he suffered multiple injuries sustained in a car accident.

Ortega died of a respiratory disorder, which added to kidney failure both results from a brain haemorrhage, in 2007 in San Pedro Sula.

Honours

Manager
Real C.D. España
Liga Nacional de Fútbol de Honduras: (2): 1988–89, 1990–91
C.S. Cartaginés
CONCACAF Champions' Cup (1): 1994
Olimpia
Liga Nacional de Fútbol de Honduras (1): 1995–96
Marathón
Liga Nacional de Fútbol de Honduras (1): 2002–03 C

Individual
Honduran Liga Nacional Top Scorer: (1): 1969–70

References

1944 births
2007 deaths
Footballers from São Paulo
Brazilian footballers
Association football forwards
Fluminense FC players
C.D. Luis Ángel Firpo footballers
C.D. Marathón players
Real C.D. España players
Brazilian expatriate footballers
Brazilian expatriate sportspeople in El Salvador
Expatriate footballers in El Salvador
Brazilian expatriate sportspeople in Honduras
Expatriate footballers in Honduras
Brazilian football managers
Real C.D. España managers
Honduras national football team managers
Brazilian expatriate football managers
Brazilian expatriate sportspeople in Costa Rica
Expatriate football managers in Costa Rica
Brazilian expatriate sportspeople in Guatemala
Expatriate football managers in Guatemala
Expatriate football managers in Honduras
Brazilian emigrants to Honduras
Naturalised citizens of Honduras
Honduran people of Brazilian descent
Honduran football managers
C.D. Olimpia managers
C.D. Marathón managers
F.C. Motagua managers
Platense F.C. managers